October 11 – Eastern Orthodox liturgical calendar – October 13

All fixed commemorations below celebrated on October 25 by Eastern Orthodox Churches on the Old Calendar.

For October 12th, Orthodox Churches on the Old Calendar commemorate the Saints listed on September 29.

Saints
 Virgin-martyr Anastasia of Rome (c. 250)  (see also: October 29)
 Martyr Domnina of Anazarbus in Cilicia (286)
 Martyr Malfetha, shot with arrows.
 Martyr Anthea, martyred within a brazen bull.
 Holy seventy (70) martyrs.
 Martyrs Juventinus and Maximinus (361)  (see also: September 5, October 9)
 Martyrs Andromachos and Diodoros, by fire.
 Saint Martin the Merciful, Bishop of Tours (397)  (see also: November 11, November 12, July 4)
 Martyrs Probus, Tarachus, and Andronicus, at Tarsus in Cilicia (304)
 Saint Cosmas the Hymnographer, Bishop of Maiuma (c. 787)  (see also: October 14)
 Saint Theodotus, Bishop of Ephesus, reposed in peace.
 Saint Jason, Bishop of Damascus, reposed in peace.
 Venerable Theosebius the God-bearer, of Arsinoe in Cyprus.
 Venerable Symeon the New Theologian (1022)

Pre-Schism Western saints
 Saint Monas, Bishop of Milan (249)
 Hieromartyr Maximilian, Bishop of Noricum (284)
 Saint Edistius, a martyr in Ravenna in Italy under Diocletian (303)
 Martyrs Evagrius, Priscian and Companions, a group of martyrs either in Rome or else in Syria.
 Saint Pantalus, Bishop of Basle in Switzerland (451)
 Saints Felix and Cyprian, Bishops in North Africa, with 4966 martyrs, under Hunneric (c. 484)
 Saint Fiace (Fiech), a bishop in Ireland, friend and disciple of St Patrick, in whose honour he wrote a hymn which still exists (5th century)
 Saint Mobhi of Glasnevin (Mobhí Clárainech), one of the Twelve Apostles of Ireland (544)
 Saint Salvinus, Bishop of Verona in Italy (562)
 Martyr Edwin of Northumbria, King of Northumbria (633)
 Saint Wilfrid, Bishop of York and Confessor (709)
 Saints Herlindis and Relindis, Daughters of Count Adelard, who became respectively the first and second abbesses of Maaseik Abbey (c. 745 and 750)

Post-Schism Orthodox saints
 Saint Epiktitos the Wonderworker, and with him several ascetics of the "300 Allemagne Saints", in Cyprus (12th century):
 Saints Valantios; Varlaam; Barnabus the Monk; Basil the Bishop; George (Vavatsiniotis); George (Epitideiotis); George (Perachoritis); George (Salamanis); Dimitrianos the Bishop; Irenikos (or Arniakos); Elpidios; and Epahroditos.
 Venerable Saints Amphilochius (1452), Macarius (1480), and Tarasius (1440), Abbots, and Theodosius, monk (15th century), of Glushitsa Monastery, Vologda, disciples of St. Dionysius of Glushitsa.
 Saint Arsenius, Archimandrite, of Svyatogorsk Monastery (1859)
 Saint Euphrosyne (Mezenova) the Faster, Schema-Abbess, of Siberia (1918)

New Martys and Confessors
 New Hieromartyr John Letnikov (1930)
 New Hieromartyr Juvenal (Maslovsky), Archbishop of Ryazan (1937) 
 New Hieromartyr Lawrence (Levchenko), Hieromonk, of Optina Monastery (1937)
 New Hieromartyr Alexander Pozdeyevsky, Priest (1940)
 New Hiero-confessor Nicholas (Mogilevsky), Metropolitan of Alma-Ata (1955)

Other commemorations
 Icon of the Most Holy Theotokos "Jerusalem" (48)
 Icon of the Mother of God of Yaroslav-Smolensk (1642)
 Icon of the Most Holy Theotokos "Rudensk" (1687)
 Icon of the Most Holy Theotokos "Kaluga" (1812)
 Commemoration of Saint Dismas the Good Thief in Thessaloniki (1st century)  (see also: March 25)
 Translation of a Particle of the Life Giving Cross of the Lord from Malta to Gatchina, together with the Philermia Icon of the Mother of God, and the right hand of Saint John the Baptist (1799)
 Translation of the relics of St. Sabbas the Sanctified from Rome to Jerusalem (1965)
 Synaxis of the Saints of Athens (1999)
 Glorification (2009) of St. Philaret (Gumilevsky), Archbishop of Chernigov (1866)

Icon gallery

Notes

References

Sources 
 October 12/25. Orthodox Calendar (PRAVOSLAVIE.RU).
 October 25 / October 12. HOLY TRINITY RUSSIAN ORTHODOX CHURCH (A parish of the Patriarchate of Moscow).
 October 12. OCA - The Lives of the Saints.
 The Autonomous Orthodox Metropolia of Western Europe and the Americas (ROCOR). St. Hilarion Calendar of Saints for the year of our Lord 2004. St. Hilarion Press (Austin, TX). p. 76.
 The Twelfth Day of the Month of October. Orthodoxy in China.
 October 12. Latin Saints of the Orthodox Patriarchate of Rome.
 The Roman Martyrology. Transl. by the Archbishop of Baltimore. Last Edition, According to the Copy Printed at Rome in 1914. Revised Edition, with the Imprimatur of His Eminence Cardinal Gibbons. Baltimore: John Murphy Company, 1916. pp. 315–316.
 Rev. Richard Stanton. A Menology of England and Wales, or, Brief Memorials of the Ancient British and English Saints Arranged According to the Calendar, Together with the Martyrs of the 16th and 17th Centuries. London: Burns & Oates, 1892. pp. 487–491.
Greek Sources
 Great Synaxaristes:  12 ΟΚΤΩΒΡΙΟΥ. ΜΕΓΑΣ ΣΥΝΑΞΑΡΙΣΤΗΣ.
  Συναξαριστής. 12 Οκτωβρίου. ECCLESIA.GR. (H ΕΚΚΛΗΣΙΑ ΤΗΣ ΕΛΛΑΔΟΣ).
  12/10/2017. Ορθόδοξος Συναξαριστής. 
Russian Sources
  25 октября (12 октября). Православная Энциклопедия под редакцией Патриарха Московского и всея Руси Кирилла (электронная версия). (Orthodox Encyclopedia - Pravenc.ru).
  12 октября по старому стилю / 25 октября по новому стилю. Русская Православная Церковь - Православный церковный календарь на 2016 год.

October in the Eastern Orthodox calendar